Triolena is a genus of flowering plants in the family Melastomataceae. They are found in southern Mexico southward to Bolivia. As of 1991 there were 20 to 25 species.

Species include:
 Triolena allardii (Wurdack) Wurdack
 Triolena amazonica (Pilg.) Wurdack
 Triolena asplundii Wurdack
 Triolena barbeyana Cogn.
 Triolena calciphila (Standl. & Steyerm.) Standl. & L.O. Williams
 Triolena campii (Wurdack) Wurdack
 Triolena dressleri Wurdack
 Triolena hirsuta (Benth.) Triana
 Triolena hygrophylla (Naudin) L.O. Williams
 Triolena izabalensis Standl. & Steyerm.
 Triolena obliqua (Triana) Wurdack
 Triolena paleolata Donn. Sm.
 Triolena pedemontana Wurdack
 Triolena pileoides (Triana) Wurdack
 Triolena pluvialis (Wurdack) Wurdack
 Triolena pumila Umaña & Almeda
 Triolena pustulata Triana
 Triolena scorpioides Naudin
 Triolena spicata (Triana) L.O. Williams
 Triolena stenophylla (Standl. & Steyerm.) Standl. & L.O. Williams

References

External links

 Triolena photographs. Tropical Plant Guides. Field Museum, Chicago.

 
Melastomataceae genera
Taxonomy articles created by Polbot